Oakville Festivals of Film and Art is a not-for-profit organization that runs the Oakville Film Festival, as well as special screening and Arts events such as the Sheridan/OFFA Annual Screening series. The festival will celebrate its 10th year in 2023, and is held the third week of June every year, and includes a juried award competition, and Audience Choice Awards for the best feature and best short film. The Oakville Film Festival is a Canadian Screen Award Qualifying Event. An Industry Summit for the Canadian Film Industry and local filmmakers is held every year in conjunction with the festival, but has also become a year-round event that features industry workshops/panels, which provide professional development for the filmmaking community. To date, the festival has attracted over 25,000 event participants, screened over 600 films, and attracted over 700 industry guests.

For 2022, the festival hosted its biggest and longest festival yet, 113 films over 7 days, with most films available both live and virtually. The festival hosted three gala events, including a Saturday night Fundraiser for Unite with Ukraine, that managed to raise thousands of dollars for the Ukrainian World Congress, while attracting films and filmmakers from around the world including Florida, England, Ireland, and British Columbia. In 2021, OFFA achieved a huge online presence, attracting over 5,000 people to its online screening platform, as well as live screenings at the local Indie cinema and Drive In Theatre, screening over 100 films from Canada and all over the world.  As early as 2020, the festival has increased its reach to audiences and filmmakers substantially by doing hybrid digital/live screening events. The 2020 year featured the Canadian theatrical Premiere of The Cuban at The Five Drive In in Oakville, as well as many more Canadian and World Premieres.  Over 70% of the films screened are Canadian and the festival has a reputation for screening the work of local filmmakers from the area, but also of attracting filmmakers from around the world to its June Festival. The 7th edition of the festival featured 21 feature films and documentaries, over 42 short films, 3 events, (including a screening of I’m Going to Break Your Heart and a special concert with Canadian Performers Chantal Kreviazuk and Raine Maida, as well as 2 days of interactive industry sessions. The event attracted a record number of filmmakers and industry guests and featured record audiences.

After being almost completely virtual during the pandemic, the festival returned to live events in 2022 with 21 feature films and documentaries, and 92 short films, most available both live at film.ca cinemas in Oakville as well as on a virtual screening platform.  A highlight of the 2022 festival was An Evening to Celebrate Ukrainian Arts and Culture, featuring Chantal Kreviazuk in support of the Ukrainian World Foundation. The event featured dancers from the Mississauga-based Barvinok Dance School, as well as a screening of The Earth if Blue as an Orange by Ukrainian filmmaker Iryna Tsilyk.

The 7th edition of the festival featured 21 feature films and documentaries, over 42 short films, 3 events, (including a screening of I'm Going to Break Your Heart and a special concert with Canadian performers Chantal Kreviazuk and Raine Maida. As well as 2 days of interactive industry sessions. The event attracted a record number of filmmakers and industry guests and featured record audiences.

History 

Founded in 2014 by Oakville residents Wendy Donnan, Judah Hernandez and Stephanie Colebrook, Oakville Festivals of Film and Art is going into its 8th year in 2021. OFFA and OFFA Online is a community-oriented festival. They aim to bring the best documentaries, features and short films to cinephiles in Southern Ontario. Each year, in late June, OFFA hosts the Oakville Film Festival which is Oakville's only independent film festival. The festival has grown in stature and length, having gone from a 3 day event in 2017 to a 7 day virtual event in 2021 and a 7 day hybrid event for 2022.

General Information 
The Oakville Film Festival, run by Oakville Festivals of Film and Art,  presents feature films, shorts and documentaries of famous and award-winning auteurs, as well as the works of local Canadian filmmakers both new and experienced.

OFFA showcases feature-length productions, including documentaries, and short films, many coming from Oakville or surrounding communities. OFFA organizes special screening series to raise money, and awareness, for local organizations with which OFFA collaborates on programming.

OFFA works with other non-profit organizations for their events and presentations.

Mission 
OFFA aims to:

 Produce outstanding events and initiatives
 Present thought-provoking productions that explore relevant social issues
 Incentivize the development and growth of the local film and art industry
 Gather a enlightened, supportive and analytical audience where new artists may showcase their art

Film Competitions and Awards 
Film Awards (Jury and Audience Choice Awards)

 Best Canadian Feature Film
 Best Feature Film
 Best Documentary
 Best International Short film
 Best Canadian Short film
 Best Director
 Best Canadian Director
 Best Indigenous Film
 Best Student Film 
 Honorable mentions for actors
 Audience Choice Awards for best Feature and best short film (Audience Vote)

References 

Film festivals in Ontario
Culture of the Regional Municipality of Halton
Oakville, Ontario
Art festivals in Canada